KUBU-LP (96.5 FM) is an American low-power FM radio station owned by the Sacramento Community Cable Foundation based in Sacramento, California. KUBU-LP is a community broadcast station that features programming ranging from alternative news, talk, and many music formats.

See also
List of community radio stations in the United States

References

External links 
Access Sacramento official website

Community radio stations in the United States
UBU-LP
UBU-LP
Radio stations established in 2014
2014 establishments in California